Paolaura kloosi is a species of very small sea snail, a marine gastropod mollusk or micromollusk in the family Granulinidae. The species was first described by Bozzetti in 2009.

Description
The length of the shell attains 1.1 mm.

Distribution
This marine species occurs off Flores, Indonesia.

References

 Bozzetti, L., 2009. Paolaura kloosi (Gastropoda: Hypsogastropoda: Cystiscidae) nuova specie dall'isola di Flores. Malacologia Mostra Mondiale 64: 16-17

Granulinidae
Gastropods described in 2009